Indo-Brazilian may refer to:
As an adjective, anything concerning Brazil–India relations
Indian immigration to Brazil
Brazilians in India
the Indu-Brasil breed of cattle